The Bellwin scheme is a United Kingdom government emergency financial assistance which "reimburses local authorities for costs incurred on, or in connection with, their immediate actions to safeguard life and property or to prevent suffering or severe inconvenience as a result of a disaster or emergency in their area".

Framework
The scheme is usually set up in response to weather events, but can also be used to cover other circumstances. It is a discretionary scheme which exists to give special financial assistance to local authorities which would otherwise be faced with an undue financial burden as a result of providing relief and carrying out immediate work due to large-scale emergencies. Where the criteria of the scheme are met, the grant is normally payable to authorities at 85% of the eligible costs incurred above a threshold set for each authority, although occasionally the grant rate is increased to 100%.

The scheme is named after a 1980s environment minister, Lord Bellwin, who, as Irwin Bellow had been leader of Leeds City Council from 1975 to 1979. In 1983, Bellwin introduced the compensation scheme, which was incorporated in the Local Government and Housing Act 1989 and revised in 2014.

A Bellwin scheme may be activated, at the discretion of the environment secretary, 
when an emergency or disaster involving destruction of, or danger to, life or property occurs; 
and, as a result, one or more local authorities incur expenditure on, or in connection with the taking of immediate action;
or to safeguard life or property or to prevent suffering or severe inconvenience in a local authority's area or among its inhabitants.

Councils, police, fire and national park authorities are eligible for Bellwin reimbursement when they have spent more than the usual threshold 0.2% of their calculated annual revenue budget on works which meet the above criteria that have been reported to the Department as eligible for an announced grant scheme.

Bellwin-like schemes under the devolved administrations of the United Kingdom
Bellwin support or schemes are the responsibility of the devolved administrations outside England. The scheme's operation in Scotland is under the control of the Scottish Government, but is broadly the same the English scheme. The Welsh Government operates an equivalent scheme called the Emergency Financial Assistance Scheme (EFAS).

The Northern Ireland Executive has established specific, time-limited schemes rather than a single equivalent to the Bellwin scheme. The most recent scheme runs from July to August 2019.

Events for which the Bellwin scheme has been enacted

England

Scotland

Reform
In January 2014 Eric Pickles, the Secretary of State for Communities and Local Government announced that during the 2013–2014 floods the Bellwin scheme would refund 100% of local spending, with the threshold of 0.02% of annual council revenue also reduced. He also announced that a full review of the Bellwin scheme was also to be undertaken, with a view to future reform.

See also
European Union Solidarity Fund, a disaster relief fund operated by the European Union for member states, which has a much higher threshold of loss requirement (€3 billion at 2002 prices, or more than 0.6% gross national income).
List of natural disasters in Britain and Ireland

References

External links
House of Commons Library Briefing Paper: The Bellwin Scheme
Summary of past Bellwin grant payments 1989-2000

Emergency management in the United Kingdom